Mehmet Emin İlhan is a Turkish politician from the Peoples' Democratic Party (HDP), who served as a Member of Parliament for the electoral district of Ağrı from 7 June to 1 November 2015.

Early life and career
İlhan graduated from primary and secondary education in the district of Doğubeyazıt and attended Yüzüncü Yıl University Faculty of Mathematics between 1997 and 2002. He became a teacher in the city of Van in 2002.

Political career
İlhan was active in the Youth Wing of the People's Democracy Party (HADEP) during his student years and was elected as a HDP Member of Parliament for Ağrı in the June 2015 general election, but lost his seat in the November 2015 snap election.

See also
25th Parliament of Turkey

References

External links
 MP profile on the Grand National Assembly website
 Collection of all relevant news items at Haberler.com

Peoples' Democratic Party (Turkey) politicians
Deputies of Ağrı
Members of the 25th Parliament of Turkey
Living people
People from Ağrı
Year of birth missing (living people)